The Maasai Cricket Warriors (MCW) is a Kenyan men's cricket team formed in 2007 by semi-nomadic people from Laikipia County. Consisting of 25 players and a counterpart women's team, it participates in semi-professional tournaments aboard, including in London primarily focused on raising funds and awareness through charity cricket and uses its athletic fame for the promotion of  women's rights, campaign against female genital mutilation, child marriage, substance abuse, and Environmental Conservation In Kenya in Kenya.

Captained by Sonyanga Ole Ngais, it is the only and the first cricket team formed in the history of Maasai community. The tribe is known for lion hunting, a rite of coming of age. They left hunting after learning cricket.

Background 
The MCW was originally introduced to cricket by Aliya Bauer, a South African primatologist. Bauer noticed the group when she was conducting research in Il Polei village. She purchased equipments and taught them cricket. The semi-nomadic group found the game interesting after realising it looks similar to their traditional hunting and spear-throwing.

In 2012, they moved to Mombasa where they learnt cricket at the Legends Cricket Nursery under the coaching of Steve Tikolo, Thomas Odoyo, and Jimmy Kamande. Their participation in 2013 Last Man Stands championship, London caught attention of their elders (head of Maasai tribe) that subsequently became a subject of discussion with elders about women's rights in Kenya.

In 2017 the MCW also appeared in an awareness campaign for the protection of the northern white rhinoceros after it participated in a charity cricket tournament, Last male Standing Rhino Cup against the British Army Training Unit Kenya cricket team.

Clothing and equipments 
The MCW players wanted to play cricket wearing their traditional dresses of red colour, bracelets, traditional guard around the body, and sandals made from recycled tires during their 2012 tour of South Africa for Last Man Stands Championship, Twenty20. Besides wearing pads and batting gloves, players also wear traditional dress of Maasai, red shawls and jewels. Players often wear coloured bead-necklace during matches.

Fundraising 
The International Cricket Council (ICC) provided financial aid to the team in the late 2010 for World AIDS Day tournament. It also received financial assistance from the Cricket Without Boundaries, Last Man Stand, 28Too Many British Army Training Unit Kenya, International cricket Council for safeguarding cricket. among many other organisations.

MCW in films 
In 2015, a documentary titled Warriors was created by a British film director, Barney Douglas, consisting a detailed account of the team.

"The Journey Is The Destination" is a 2016 biographical drama film based on the life of photojournalist Dan Eldon. The film follows Dan's journey as he travels to Somalia to document the conflict and famine, and his ultimate death at the age of 22 while covering the refugee crisis in Somalia. The film highlights Dan's passion for life, art, and activism, as well as his commitment to shining a light on the suffering of others. The film stars Ben Schnetzer as Dan Eldon, and was directed by Bronwen Hughes.

African Drivers “Lion Lights Story” is a short documentary about the Masaai community and their effort to conserve all African Wildlife and preserve the landscape.

Narrated from the safari driver’s point of view African Drivers “Lion Lights Story” is an immersive journey conformed by special and unique moments of the people of Africa capturing the viewer’s emotions through the Masaai’s daily activities, customs and surroundings; It delivers extraordinary and intimate insights providing a wealthy legacy of knowledge in wildlife conservation to the inhabitants of this world.

Wildlife Conservation is a matter that concerns us all. Let us commit to our planet and protect it for the good of our present and future generations. After all, under the heavens there is but one great family and the responsibility is entirely ours.
 Laikipiak people
 Maasai people

References

Further reading

External links 
 
 Official website

Cricket teams in Kenya
Sports organizations established in 2007
2007 establishments in Kenya
 Kenya
Women's rights organizations
Children's rights organizations
HIV/AIDS prevention organizations